The Heritage Cup is an annual cup rivalry between Major League Soccer (MLS) teams San Jose Earthquakes and Seattle Sounders FC. Both teams carried their names forward from their North American Soccer League (NASL) predecessors.

Club namesakes

History

Overall stats

Cup history
The Heritage Cup trophy was conceived and designed by San Jose Earthquakes fan Rob Stevenson and was commissioned by San Jose's Soccer Silicon Valley Community Foundation in collaboration with Seattle Sounders FC supporters. The competition began in 2009 when the expansion Seattle began play, becoming the second MLS team named after their North American Soccer League counterpart – San Jose having been the first when they inherited the Earthquakes name in time for the 2000 season.

MLS era
The original Earthquakes and Sounders sides did have a rivalry while playing in the NASL. However, it did not completely resurface during the 2009 season with fans of both teams viewing other clubs as bigger rivals. That season, the first MLS meeting of the teams was not considered for the competition due to the schedule consisting of two games in Seattle and only one in San Jose. Seattle won the initial meeting at home 2–0 and the second 2–1. The San Jose Earthquakes won the inaugural cup on goals scored after a 4–0 home victory on August 2, 2009.

Present and future MLS teams that carry on the name of their market's NASL predecessors are eligible to join the competition. However, when the Portland Timbers and Vancouver Whitecaps FC became eligible to compete for the cup upon joining the league in 2011, both teams' supporters elected not to participate.  They left open the possibility of joining if a couple of additional eligible teams join the MLS, thereby better differentiating the Heritage Cup from the Cascadia Cup.

The 2012 MLS Season brought an unbalanced schedule for the first time since 2009. The rules to the cup therefore reverted to counting only the last two matches between the teams, the way it will be counted in any season that has an unbalanced schedule.

Due to the COVID-19 pandemic in 2020 the organizers sent out the following proposal
Gentlemen,
Here is the latest information for you about the 2020 Heritage Cup, the annual competition between San Jose and Seattle. The Quakes have not won the Cup since 2015, while Seattle displayed the Cup and used it in-stadium to promote their anniversary last year.
As you know, the Heritage Cup is a joint operation between San Jose fans and some Sounders fans. This year presents a special challenge and we could only come up with one viable option, which is to use the July 10 San Jose vs Seattle game in Orlando as the Heritage Cup game for 2020. We delayed until now to arrange this, hoping to hear about the league schedule, but that didn’t happen. So this will be a one-game competition, on neutral ground.
We hope that this might also help the MLS Is Back tournament as well. If you can help us get information about this game and the Heritage Cup to MLS and especially to the ESPN producers and broadcast team as quickly as possible, this might be an additional storyline they can use in their telecast to add a little more drama to the game.
This match ended in a 0-0 draw and the winner of the Group stage (B) at the MLS is Back tournament, San Jose Earthquakes, was awarded the Heritage Cup for 2020.

For 2021 there was an unbalanced three-game regular season schedule between the two competing MLS teams. The Heritage Cup was awarded based on the results of the final two of three matches of each participating team, with each team hosting one match, namely the July 31 match hosted by Seattle Sounders FC and the September 29 match hosted by San Jose Earthquakes. Seattle regained the Cup with their 3-1 victory in San Jose.

MLS Honours

Results
Competitive matches only

NASL era 
For statistical purposes, matches that went to shootouts are counted as draws. Matches ending with a shootout are denoted with an '*'.' Alliance era 

 1996–2008 
Results from when the two teams played each other between 1996 and 2008.

 MLS era 

 Cup winners by season 

Western Conference standings finishes

• Total: Seattle with 12 higher finishes, San Jose with 1.

 Statistical leaders Bold''' denotes player is still able to play in competition.  Updated through game played on November 8, 2020

 Top goalscorers 
, at least two goals included in table Top assists 
, at least two goals included in table''

Notes

References

External links 
 

Soccer cup competitions in the United States
San Jose Earthquakes
Seattle Sounders FC
Heritage Cup
North American Soccer League (1968–1984)